The members of the sixteenth National Assembly of South Korea were elected on 13 April 2000. The Assembly sat from 30 May 2000 until 29 May 2004.

Members

References

016
National Assembly members 016